NRB TV is an evangelical Christian cable channel founded by members of the National Religious Broadcasters, a non-partisan, international association of Christian communicators. While the NRB association is located in Manassas, Virginia, the channel's corporate headquarters is located in Nashville, Tennessee. Created in 2005, the network can be seen on DirecTV satellite and broadcast affiliates making it available to a national audience of over 40 million viewers. Programming can also be streamed at nrbtv.org, on Roku players, and via a mobile app available for iPhones, iPods, iPads, Android phones, Android tablets, and Windows Phones.

Programming
Like the NRB association itself, the programming on NRB TV reflects on a belief in conservative Christianity, particularly Protestantism and evangelicalism. Many programs broadcast on the NRB Network are produced by members of the National Religious Broadcasters association.

NRB TV broadcasts independently produced content in various formats, including talk shows, dramas, reality shows and documentaries. Weekday morning programming is dedicated to devotional programming including Renewing Your Mind with R.C. Sproul, Precepts for Life with Kay Arthur, Quick Study with Rod Hembree. The channel's daytime schedule is targeted to a female audience with fitness programs and talk shows that include New Life Live with Steve Arterburn, The 700 Club, and Babbie's House, which is hosted by recording artist Babbie Mason. NRB TV's primetime lineup features an emphasis on Christian apologetics and includes apologists Ravi Zacharias, William Lane Craig, Eric Metaxas, Ken Ham and John Lennox.

Weekend programming on the channel includes kids shows on Saturday mornings and teen programs in the evening. Sunday programming is dedicated to teaching and preaching shows from pastors representing a variety of evangelical denominations. Among NRB TV's Sunday lineup are Turning Point Ministries with David Jeremiah, Live at Thomas Road with Jonathan Falwell, Living Truth with Charles Price, and Love Worth Finding with the late Adrian Rogers.

Affiliates

 WCKV-LD 22.4 Clarksville, Tennessee
 WOBV 5.1 Starkville, Mississippi
 WJGN-CD 38.1 Chesapeake, Virginia
 KHWB-LD 38.1 Eugene, Oregon
 WSOT-LD 27.1 Marion, Indiana
 WFTT-DT 62.1 Venice, Florida

External links
 

Religious television stations in the United States
Evangelical television networks
Television channels and stations established in 2005
Organizations that oppose LGBT rights
English-language television stations in the United States
Mass media in Nashville, Tennessee